Freedom of religion in Pakistan is guaranteed by the Constitution of Pakistan for individuals of various religions and religious sects.

Pakistan gained independence in 1947 and was founded upon the concept of Two-nation theory. At the time of Pakistan's creation the 'hostage theory' had been espoused. According to this theory the Hindu minority in Pakistan was to be given a fair deal in Pakistan in order to ensure the protection of the Muslim minority in India. However, Khawaja Nazimuddin, the 2nd Prime Minister of Pakistan, stated: "I do not agree that religion is a private affair of the individual nor do I agree that in an Islamic state every citizen has identical rights, no matter what his caste, creed or faith be".

Pakistan has a population estimated at 224,418,238, as of 2021. It is estimated that 96.5% of Pakistanis are Muslims (75-95% Sunni, 5-20% Shia, and 0.22-2.2% Ahmadi, who are not permitted to call themselves Muslims—see Religious discrimination in Pakistan), while the remainder are Hindus, Christians, Sikhs, Zoroastrians, members of other faiths, and agnostics and atheists.

In 2016, Sindh, Pakistan's most religiously diverse province, with 8% religious minority population (predominantly Hindus) passed a bill that outlawed forced conversions. After being passed by the Provincial Assembly, the bill was tabled by a faction of the Pakistan Muslim League called PML-F, Pakistan Muslim League Functional, which in Sindh is led by Sufi leader Pir Pagara.

Constitutional position

The original Constitution of Pakistan did not discriminate between Muslims and non-Muslims. However, the amendments made during President Muhammad Zia-ul-Haq's Islamization led to the controversial Hudood Ordinance and Shariat Court. Later, Prime Minister Nawaz Sharif's government tried to enforce a Shariat Bill, passed in May 1991. After the incident of 9/11, Pervez Musharraf's government took steps to curtail religious intolerance against non-Muslims.

Blasphemy laws

The Pakistani government does not restrict religious publishing. However, it restricts the right to freedom of speech with regard to religion. Speaking in opposition to Islam and publishing an attack on Islam or its prophets are prohibited. Pakistan's penal code mandates the death penalty or life in prison for anyone defiling the name of Muhammad. This penal code mandates life imprisonment for desecrating the Quran, and up to 10 years' imprisonment for insulting another's religious beliefs with intent to outrage religious feelings.

Pakistan's blasphemy laws are problematic both in their form and their application and have been the source of much debate and harm since the 1980s. It has been alleged in some cases that Muslims who have engaged in public debate about their religion have been prosecuted for blasphemy. The Federal Minister for Minorities Affairs, Shahbaz Bhatti, was assassinated on 2 March 2011 for his lifelong stand against the laws and the Governor of Punjab, Salmaan Taseer, was killed by his own bodyguard on 4 January 2011 for standing up for a blasphemy defendant. Many atheists in Pakistan have been lynched and imprisoned over unsubstantiated allegations of blasphemy. When the state initiated a full-fledged crackdown on atheism since 2017, it has become worse with secular bloggers being kidnapped and the government running advertisements urging people to identify blasphemers among them and the highest judges declaring such people to be terrorists.

Christian scriptures and books are available in Karachi and in travelling bookmobiles. Hindu and Parsi scriptures are freely available. Foreign books and magazines may be imported freely, but are subject to censorship for religious content.

The Ahmadi position
The Pakistan government does not ban formally the public practice of the Ahmadiyya, but its practice is restricted severely by law. A 1974 constitutional amendment declared Ahmadis to be a non-Muslim minority because, according to the Government, they do not accept Muhammad as the last prophet of Islam. However, Ahmadis consider themselves to be Muslims and observe Islamic practices. In 1984, under Ordinance XX the government added Section 298(c) into the Penal Code, prohibiting Ahmadis from calling themselves Muslim or posing as Muslims; from referring to their faith as Islam; from preaching or propagating their faith; from inviting others to accept the Ahmadi faith; and from insulting the religious feelings of Muslims.
. This section of the Penal Code has caused problems for Ahmadis, particularly the provision that forbids them from "directly or indirectly" posing as Muslims. The Ahmadis must not use the standard Muslim greeting form and must not name their children Muhammad. The constitutionality of Section 286(c) was upheld in a split-decision Supreme Court case in 1996. The punishment for violation of this section is imprisonment for up to 3 years and a fine. It has been alleged that this provision has been used extensively by the Government and anti-Ahmadi religious groups to target and harass Ahmadis. Ahmadis also are prohibited from holding any conferences or gatherings.

Electoral process for non-Muslims
In 1980s Zia ul-Haq introduced a system under which non-Muslims could vote for only candidates of their own religion. Seats were reserved for minorities in the national and provincial assemblies. Government officials stated that the separate electorates system is a form of affirmative action designed to ensure minority representation, and that efforts are underway to achieve a consensus among religious minorities on this issue. But critics argue that under this system Muslim candidates no longer had any incentive to pay attention to the minorities. Pakistan's separate electoral system for different religions has been described as 'political Apartheid'. Hindu community leader Sudham Chand protested against the system but was murdered. In 1999, Pakistan abolished this system.

Legal and personal freedom for non-Muslims
The judicial system encompasses several different court systems with overlapping and sometimes competing jurisdiction, reflecting differences in civil, criminal, and Islamic jurisprudence. The federal sharia court and the sharia bench of the Supreme Court serve as appellate courts for certain convictions in criminal court under the Hudood Ordinances, and judges and attorneys in these courts must be Muslims. The federal sharia court also may overturn any legislation judged to be inconsistent with the tenets of Islam.

The Hudood Ordinances criminalize non-marital rape, extramarital sex, and various gambling, alcohol, and property offences. The Hudood Ordinances are applied to Muslims and non-Muslims alike. Some Hudood Ordinance cases are subject to Hadd, or Quranic, punishment; others are subject to Tazir, or secular punishment.

Although both types of cases are tried in ordinary criminal courts, special rules of evidence apply in Hadd cases, which discriminate against non-Muslims. For example, a non-Muslim may testify only if the victim also is non-Muslim. Likewise, the testimony of women, Muslim or non-Muslim, is not admissible in cases involving Hadd punishments. Crimes like theft and rape which do not satisfy the conditions of punishments under hadd, are instead punished under the tazir system. A non-Muslim convicted of zina cannot be stoned under the hudood ordinance.

Christian Church leaders argue that the government needs to go beyond the rhetoric of "minorities are enjoying all rights in the country" when they are not, and take practical steps to ensure that this is done. 

According to a survey in 2010 by the Pew Global Attitudes Project, 76% of Pakistanis polled supported the death penalty for those who leave Islam.

Sexual freedom
The Penal Code incorporates a number of Islamic law provisions. The judicial system encompasses several different court systems with overlapping and sometimes competing jurisdictions that reflect differences in civil, criminal, and Islamic jurisprudence. The Federal Shari'a Court and the Shari'a bench of the Supreme Court serve as appellate courts for certain convictions in criminal court under the Hudood Ordinance, which criminalizes rape, extramarital sex, property crimes, alcohol, and gambling; judges and attorneys in these courts must be Muslim. The Federal Shari'a Court may overturn any legislation judged inconsistent with the tenets of Islam. In March 2005, however, the Supreme Court Chief Justice ruled that the Federal Shari'a Court had no jurisdiction to review a decision by a provincial high court even if the Federal Shari'a Court should have had initial appellate jurisdiction.

For both Muslims and non-Muslims, all consensual extramarital sexual relations are considered a violation of the Hudood Ordinances. If a woman cannot prove the absence of consent in a rape case, there is a risk that she may be charged with a violation of the Hudood Ordinances for fornication or adultery. The maximum punishment for this offence is public flogging or stoning. However, there are no recorded instances of either type of punishment since the law was introduced.

According to a police official, in a majority of rape cases, the victims are pressured to drop rape charges because of the threat of Hudood adultery charges being brought against them. A parliamentary commission of inquiry for women has criticized the Hudood Ordinances and recommended their repeal. It also has been charged that the laws on adultery and rape have been subject to widespread misuse, and that 95 percent of the women accused of adultery are found innocent in the court of first instance or on appeal. This commission found that the main victims of the Hudood Ordinances are poor women who are unable to defend themselves against slanderous charges. According to the commission, the laws also have been used by husbands and other male family members to punish their wives and female family members for reasons that have nothing to do with perceived sexual impropriety. Approximately one-third or more of the women in jails in Lahore, Peshawar, and Mardan in 1998 were awaiting trial for adultery under the Hudood Ordinances.

However, a major amendment was passed to fix and/or get rid of these archaic laws. The Woman's Protection Bill passed in 2006. It returned a number of offences from the Zina Ordinance to the Pakistan Penal Code, where they had been before 1979, and created an entirely new set of procedures governing the prosecution of the offences of adultery and fornication, whipping and amputation were removed as punishments.  The law meant women would not be jailed if they were unable to prove rape, and allows rape to be proved on grounds other than witnesses, such as forensics and DNA evidence.

Forced conversion

According to Minorities Concern of Pakistan, forced conversion of Christian and Hindu girls are on the rise in Pakistan. Three international Christian organizations are planning to raise their voice on this issue in the UN.
In Pakistan approximately 1000 girls from religious minority communities are forced to convert to Islam on yearly basis.

Ministry of Religious Affairs
The Ministry of Religious Affairs, which is entrusted with safeguarding religious freedom, has on its masthead a Koranic verse: "Islam is the only religion acceptable to God." The Ministry claims that it spends 30 percent of its annual budget to assist indigent minorities, to repair minority places of worship, to set up minority-run small development schemes, and to celebrate minority festivals. However, religious minorities question its expenditures, observing that localities and villages housing minority citizens go without basic civic amenities. The National Commission for Justice and Peace (NCJP) of the Catholic Bishops' Conference, using official budget figures for expenditures in 1998, calculated that the Government actually spent $17 (PRs 850) on each Muslim and only $3.20 (PRs 160) on each religious minority citizen per month.
Religious minority interests have also been represented by a Minorities Ministry, which has taken various forms and now sits under the Religious Affairs Ministry again, since June 2013.

US Resolution
On 23 September 2009, the United States House of Representatives introduced a "House Resolution 764" which calls on Pakistan to restore religious freedom in the country where Hindus, Christians, Ahmadiyyas and Baháʼís (the religions mentioned by name) are subjugated. The resolution was introduced by Representative Chris Smith. As of December 2016, the resolution failed.

See also
Religious discrimination in Pakistan
2020 Karak temple attack

References

External links
Hindus in Pakistan: What the History Books Won’t Tell You
Pakistan: Insufficient protection of religious minorities – Amnesty International report
Media reports about the persecution of Ahmadiyya
Pakistani Muslims Severely Beat, Sodomize Christian Barber
Pakistan: Religious freedom in the shadow of extremism, CSW briefing, 2011

Religion in Pakistan
Pakistan
Human rights in Pakistan